The Leopoldoff Colibri (English: Hummingbird) is a French-built light sporting and trainer biplane of the 1930s.

Development
The Colibri was designed to meet demand for an economical two-seat tandem training and sporting biplane and the prototype L.3 Colibri, powered by a  Anzani engine, first flew at Toussus-le-Noble airfield near Paris in September 1933.

Series production of the L.3 Colibri fitted with the  Salmson 9Adb engine was started in 1937 by Aucouturier-Dugoua & Cie, followed by examples built by the Societe des Avions Leopoldoff, a total of 33 aircraft being completed before World War II.

Operational history

The Colibris served with aero clubs and private owners prewar, with several surviving the conflict. Production of six further Colibris was undertaken postwar by the Societe des Constructions Aeronautiques du Maroc in Morocco, receiving their designation CAM-1. Various engines were fitted in service, and the aircraft involved received modified type numbers.

In 2011, three Colibris were active in France and two were flying in the United Kingdom.

Variants
L.3 prototype
  Anzani engine (1 built);
L.3 production prewar
  Salmson 9Adb radial engine (33 built);
L.31
 L.3 fitted with  Boitel 5Ao engine;
L.32
 L.3 fitted with Walter Mikron III engine;
CAM-1
 Colibri built postwar in Morocco (6 aircraft);
L.53
 Colibri fitted postwar with  Minie engine;
L.55
 Colibri fitted postwar with  Continental C90 engine;
L.6 
Colibri fitted postwar with Minié 4.DF.28 Horus engine;
L.7
 Colibri built postwar and fitted with a Continental A65-8S engine.

Specifications (L.55 Colibri)

References
Notes

Bibliography

External links

 Site officiel du Leo Colibri - En français

1930s French civil utility aircraft
Biplanes
Single-engined tractor aircraft
Aircraft first flown in 1933